Yusop (also Yusoph) Jikiri (1954 – 17 October 2020) was a Filipino politician, leader within the Moro National Liberation Front (MNLF) and governor (2001–2004) of Sulu Province in the Autonomous Region in Muslim Mindanao (ARMM). He also served as a representative from Sulu's 1st District (2007–10) and ran again in 2010, but lost to Tupay Loong. He was the beneficiary of shifting political alliances between the Tan and Loong families.

Background
Jikiri was born in 1951 as the son of a poor farmer in Indanan, named after a famous Moro leader/bandit under the American occupation during the Moro Rebellion. He attended Indanan Elementary, National High School, and attended college but did not finish his bachelor's degree due to the outbreak of war in 1970. He married four times and has several children; one of his sons, Thong Jikiri, is a provincial board member in the 1st District of Sulu.

Involvement in the MNLF
Jikiri joined the Moro National Liberation Front and became one of their top commanders, eventually rising to become Chief of Staff under Nur Misuari. However, in 2000 he joined 14 other MNLF officials to sign a manifesto leading to the ouster of Misuari as its leader. The so-called Council of 15 accused Misuari of being incompetent as governor of the ARMM.

Political Activities

Governor in 2001
Jikiri ran for governor of Sulu in 1998 and again in 2001 as a candidate of the People Power Coalition, a party affiliated with the MNLF. In 2001 he won, with his party (the PPC-MNLF) winning eight of the ten seats in the provincial board. His running mate was Abdel S. Anni and his campaign coordinator was Omar Bailang. It was his second try for the governorship of Sulu since the MNLF joined mainstream politics after the 1996 GRP-MNLF peace agreement. He claimed upon his victory that he only had P100,000 when he first decided to run, attributing the rest to a "modest contribution" by former Governor Tupay Loong.

Announcement of official election results were initially delayed by several contests on the results to the Commission on Elections (COMELEC). Responding to news of the delay, Jikiri's supporters stormed the gates of Camp Teodulfo Bautista (104th Army Brigade), where the COMELEC canvassing office was located. Tens of minibuses were arranged to transport supporters from different municipalities to the base.

Jikiri was sworn into office by President Gloria Macapagal Arroyo in Malacanang. In his victory speech, he vowed to emancipate the province from "poverty and ignorance" and called on the people to help it regain its historic past as a "great nation of a great people." He also urged his fellow Tausugs to move forward with peace, devoting their time and efforts on education, agriculture, infrastructure and transport development, counter-narcotics, sports development, and health services.

""My government is your government, for truly I belong to you, I am among you, a son of a poor family. To this land I give my life, body and soul. Let me, therefore, seek your cooperation. Come to me as your elder brother, (or) even as your father and together we can make this land great once more in history."

The two congressional seats in Sulu province went to Jikiri's party mate Munir Arbison (2nd district) and Nationalist People's Coalition (NPC) representative Hussin Amin (1st district).

2003 Attacks
In September 2003 Jikiri was the target of an ambush staged by Abu Sayyaf Group leader Albader Parad in Indanan. Jikiri survived the attack, but one of his aides was killed.

2004 and 2007 Elections
Jikiri ran again in 2004 but lost the governor seat to former Vice Governor Ben T. Loong. He came back to run in the 2007 elections and won the seat as representative. He also became Southern Philippines Development Authority (SPDA) chairman.

References

People from Sulu
Members of the House of Representatives of the Philippines from Sulu
Governors of Sulu
1954 births
2020 deaths
Nationalist People's Coalition politicians
Filipino Muslims
Moro National Liberation Front members